Cypress Quarters is a census-designated place (CDP) in Okeechobee County, Florida, United States. The population was 1,215 at the 2010 census.

Geography

Demographics

As of the census of 2000, there were 1,150 people, 420 households, and 291 families residing in the CDP. The racial makeup of the CDP was 29.22% White, 65.83% African American, 0.61% Native American, 0.43% Asian, 3.04% from other races, and 0.87% from two or more races. Hispanic or Latino of any race were 5.48% of the population.

There were 420 households, out of which 29.3% had children under the age of 18 living with them, 40.2% were married couples living together, 24.5% had a female householder with no husband present, and 30.7% were non-families. 25.5% of all households were made up of individuals, and 9.5% had someone living alone who was 65 years of age or older.  The average household size was 2.72 and the average family size was 3.26.

In the CDP, the population was spread out, with 30.7% under the age of 18, 9.6% from 18 to 24, 22.6% from 25 to 44, 24.1% from 45 to 64, and 13.0% who were 65 years of age or older.  The median age was 33 years. For every 100 females, there were 94.3 males.  For every 100 females age 18 and over, there were 89.3 males.

The median income for a household in the CDP was $29,565, and the median income for a family was $38,125. Males had a median income of $31,103 versus $17,411 for females. The per capita income for the CDP was $13,046.  About 25.4% of families and 30.5% of the population were below the poverty line, including 32.1% of those under age 18 and 16.7% of those age 65 or over.

References

Census-designated places in Okeechobee County, Florida
Census-designated places in Florida